János Greguss (3 May 1838, Pozsony- 31 May 1892, Budapest) was a Hungarian genre and landscape painter. He was also a popular art teacher.

Biography
After studies in Nuremberg and at the Academy of Fine Arts, Munich, he studied at the Polytechnic University in Vienna. Following his graduation, he was awarded a stipend by József Eötvös that enabled him to study abroad. 

Upon his return, he was appointed as a teacher at the Royal Drawing School. He painted with a loosely Academic approach and was heavily influenced by German art. In terms of subject matter, he tended to prefer simple, cheerful scenes; mostly from family life. In his later years, he created some realistic landscapes. His favorite areas in which to paint were those around Lake Balaton.

Many of his works may be seen at the Hungarian National Museum.

Sources
 Biographical notes @ Budapest Aukcio

Further reading
 A Pallas nagy lexikona

External links

1838 births
1892 deaths
Hungarian painters
Genre painters
Academy of Fine Arts, Munich alumni
Artists from Bratislava
Academic staff of the Hungarian University of Fine Arts